Mendol Island is an Indonesian island in the Riau province. Mendol Island is a rice mill shed for the surrounding areas.

Sources 

Islands of Indonesia